Sălaj County monograph is a book edited by Petri Mór.

All six volumes of the book were published in Budapest from 1901 to 1904. The monograph covers the main features of the history of Szilágy County.

See also 
 Monographic sketch of Sălaj County

External links 
  Szilágy vármegye monográfiája

References 

Sălaj County
1901 non-fiction books
1904 non-fiction books
History of Transylvania
20th-century history books
Hungarian books
History books about Romania